Ping Pong is the fourth studio album by American surf rock band, Jacuzzi Boys. The album was self-released on October 21, 2016.

Track listing

References

External links 
 

2016 albums
Jacuzzi Boys albums
Self-released albums